The 1915 Manitoba general election was held August 6, 1915 to elect members of the Legislative Assembly of the Province of Manitoba, Canada.  The Liberals under Norris won a landslide majority with 40 seats, replacing the Conservative government that had ruled the province since 1899.

This election was held only one year after the previous general election of 1914.  In that election, the governing Conservatives of premier Rodmond Roblin were confirmed in office with 28 seats out of 49.  In early 1915, however, the Roblin administration was forced to resign from office after a commission appointed by the Lieutenant Governor found the government guilty of corruption in the tending of contracts for new legislative buildings.

Roblin denied the charges, but resigned as premier on May 12.  Three days later, opposition Liberal leader Tobias Norris was called upon to form a new administration.  The house was quickly adjourned, and new elections were scheduled for August.

The primary issue of the campaign was corruption.  The pro-Liberal Manitoba Free Press ran numerous articles criticizing the practices of the Roblin government, and alleging that the "Roblin machine" still controlled the Conservative Party.  The Liberals claimed they would manage the province's affairs in a businesslike rather than a partisan manner, an approach typified by Provincial Treasurer Edward Brown call for the province to "forget party for five years and get down to business".

Women's suffrage and temperance were also important issues.  The Liberal Party promised to introduce voting rights for women, and to hold a provincial referendum on temperance.  The party's platform also promised direct legislation and plebiscites on other issues.

Faced with mounting unpopularity in the wake of the corruption scandal, the Conservatives chose federal Member of Parliament (MP) James Albert Manning Aikins as their new leader on July 15.  Aikins had never served in the Roblin government, and was regarded by many as free from the controversy that had taken the Conservatives from office.  In a further effort to separate themselves from the Roblin government, the Conservatives referred to themselves as the "Independent-Liberal-Conservative" party for this election.  The Liberals ridiculed this name change, and sarcastically described the "new" Conservatives as the "Purity Party".

The election results were a disaster for the Conservatives.  The party won only five seats out of 47, and Aikins lost by a considerable margin in Brandon City.  The Liberals under Norris won a landslide majority with 40 seats, the largest victory in Manitoba history, although with barely more than half the vote.

In the Winnipeg Centre district, Fred Dixon was re-elected as an independent candidate with support from both Liberals and the Labour Representation Committee.  

The Social Democratic Party also won its first ever seat in the province, taking one of the two seats in north-end Winnipeg. 

This election (like the previous one in 1914) used two-member districts in Winnipeg, with each seat being filled in separate contests.

Manitoba's francophone constituencies rejected the provincial trend, and continued to support candidates of the Conservative party (four of the five Conservative MLAs were from francophone areas).  Many francophone voters opposed Norris's plans to end provincial funding for denominational Catholic schools.

The "Independent-Liberal-Conservative" name seems to have been dropped shortly after the election.

This was the last election before Winnipeg was made into a single ten-seat district, and Single transferable voting was brought into use.

Electoral system
In this election Manitoba used a mixture of multi-member districts and single-member districts.
In the multi-member districts - Winnipeg North, Winnipeg South and Winnipeg Centre - each member was elected in a separate contest through First past the post. 

In each single-member district the member was elected through First past the post.

Results

Riding results 

Arthur:
(incumbent)John Williams (L) 815
W.S. Kenner (C) 632

Assiniboia:
John Wilton (L) 828
William Bayley (Labour Representation Committee) 773
(incumbent)John Thomas Haig (C) 590

Beautiful Plains:
William Wood (L) 1115
J. Harry Irwin (C) 918

Birtle:
(incumbent)George Malcolm (L) 873
S. Arnold (C) 422

Brandon City:
Stephen Clement (L) 1914
James Albert Manning Aikins (C) 1213

Carillon:
Albert Prefontaine (C) 629   
(incumbent)Thomas B. Molloy (L) 605

Cypress:
Andrew Myles (L) 851
(incumbent)George Steel (C) 789

Dauphin:
William Harrington (L) 739
(incumbent)William Buchanan (C) 637
J.M. McQuay (Ind) 233

Deloraine:
(incumbent)Robert Thornton (L) 1146
John C. Walker Reid (C) 851

Dufferin:
Edward August (L) 1134
Andrew S. Argue (C) 848

Elmwood:
Thomas Glendenning Hamilton (L) 2319
Donald Munro (C) 866

Emerson:
John David Baskerville (L) 1181
G. Coulter (C) 460

Gilbert Plains:
William Findlater (L) 1383
(incumbent)Sam Hughes (C) 792

Gimli:
Taras Ferley (L-Ind) 1172
(incumbent)Sveinn Thorvaldson (C) 562

(Einar Jonasson had been nominated as the official Liberal candidate, but withdrew.)

Gladstone:
(incumbent)James Armstrong (L) 1154
A. Singleton (C) 484

Glenwood:
(incumbent)James Breakey (L) 1091
John Perdue (C) 636

Hamiota:
(incumbent)John Henry McConnell (L) 1063
J. Moss Fraser (C) 596

Iberville:
(incumbent)Aime Benard (C) 527
James H. Black (L) 400

Kildonan and St. Andrews:
George Prout (L) 1295
R. Sanders (C) 754

Killarney:
Samuel Hayden (L) 779
(incumbent)George Lawrence (C) 656

Lakeside:
Charles Duncan McPherson (L) 863
(incumbent)John J. Garland (C) 700

Lansdowne:
(incumbent)Tobias Norris (L) 1334
W.J. Cundy (C) 592

La Verendrye:
Philippe Talbot (L) 713
(incumbent)Jean-Baptiste Lauzon (C) 558

Manitou:
George Thomas Armstrong (L) 1090
W.H. Sharpe (C) 1006

Minnedosa:
(incumbent)George Grierson (L) 1173
James Muir (C) 654

Morden and Rhineland:
(incumbent)Valentine Winkler (L) 1180
William Johnston Tupper (C) 712

Morris:
(incumbent)Jacques Parent (C) 740
William Molloy (L) 683

Mountain:
(incumbent)James Baird (L) 1331
John T. Dale (C) 419

Norfolk:
(incumbent)John Graham (L) 933
Robert F. Lyons (C) 770

Portage la Prairie:
(incumbent)Ewan McPherson (L) 1065
Fawcett Taylor (C) 807

Roblin:
(incumbent)Frederic Newton (C) 714
William Angus (L) 609

Rockwood:
Arthur Lobb (L) 1275
Thomas Scott (C) 639

Russell:
William Wilber Wilfred Wilson (L) 1033
J.P. Laycock (C) 614

St. Boniface:
Joseph Dumas (L) 921
J.A. Beaupre (C) 790
J.P. Howden (Ind L) 640

St. Clements:
(incumbent)Donald Ross (L/Ind) 1014
Thomas Hay (C) 489

St. George:
Skuli Sigfusson (L) 1291
Paul Reykdal (C) 831

Ste. Rose:
(incumbent)Joseph Hamelin (C) 443
Z.H. Rheaume (L) 414
A. McLeod (Ind) 266

Swan River:
(incumbent)William Sims (L) 626
Daniel D. McDonald (C) 414

Turtle Mountain:
George William McDonald (L) 687
(incumbent)James Johnson (C) 651

Virden:
(incumbent)George Clingan (L) 1181
R.A. Knight (C) 772

Winnipeg
Winnipeg North "A":
Robert Newton Lowery (L) 2443
Arthur Beech (SDP) 2248
(incumbent)Joseph P. Foley (C) 1490

Winnipeg North "B":
Richard Rigg (SDP) 2494
Solomon Hart Green (L) 2263
E.R. Levinson (C) 1248

Winnipeg Centre "A":
(incumbent)Thomas Herman Johnson (L) 6763
A.J. Norquay (C) 2346

Winnipeg Centre "B":
(incumbent)Fred Dixon (Ind) 6443
H.M. Hanneson (C) 2048
George Armstrong (SPC) 804

Winnipeg South "A":
(incumbent)Albert Hudson (L) 5986
W.J. Boyd (C) 2011

Winnipeg South "B":
(incumbent)William Parrish (L) 5635
Lendrum McMeans (C) 2303

Deferred elections
The Pas, August 25, 1915:
Edward Brown (L) accl.

Horace Halcrow had been nominated by the Conservatives to contest this riding, but withdrew before the election.  Halcrow had been Manitoba's chief game warden under the Roblin government.

Post-election changes
Rupertsland (new constituency), September 16, 1916:
John Morrison (Ind-L) accl.

Iberville (res. Aime Benard, 1917), November 1, 1917:
Arthur Boivin (C) elected

Roblin (res. Frederic Newton, 1917), November 19, 1917:
William Westwood (Ind-L) elected
Irwin L. Mitchell (L)

(A Winnipeg Free Press report from November 20, 1917 shows Westwood winning by 186 votes, with one poll yet to declare. This was likely the first provincial election where Manitoba women cast votes.)

Morris (dep. Jacques Parent, 1917; no by-election)

Minnedosa (George Grierson to cabinet, November 10, 1917), November 30, 1917:
George Grierson (L) elected

Winnipeg North "B" (res. Richard Rigg, 1917), January 15, 1918:
Robert Jacob (Union-L) 2923
E.R. Levinson (Ind) 2251

(Numbers taken from the Winnipeg Free Press.)

Rhineland (dec. Valentine Winkler, June 7, 1920; no by-election)

References 

1915 elections in Canada
1915
1915 in Manitoba
August 1915 events